The Văratec is a right tributary of the river Strei in Romania. It flows into the Strei in the village Galați.

References

Rivers of Romania
Rivers of Hunedoara County